Dolhești may refer to several places in Romania:

 Dolhești, Iași, a commune in Iași County
 Dolhești, Suceava, a commune in Suceava County
 Dolhești, a village in Pipirig Commune, Neamț County